Rozendaal is a municipality and a town in the eastern Netherlands, in the province of Gelderland. The town, next to Arnhem and Velp, is known for the Rozendaal Castle (Kasteel Rosendael) and its water fountain follies (bedriegertjes).

The municipality is the least densely populated on the mainland of the Netherlands, i.e., in effect, not on one of the West Frisian Islands. Rozendaal is one of the richest municipalities in the Netherlands.

Population centres 
 Imbosch
 Rozendaal
 Terlet

Topography

Dutch topographic map of the municipality of Rozendaal, June 2015

Notable people 
 Petrus Augustus de Génestet (1829 – 1861 in Rozendaal) a Dutch poet and theologian

Gallery

References

External links

Official website (in Dutch)

 
Municipalities of Gelderland
Populated places in Gelderland